Sahakara Nagar is a residential suburb near Bangalore, India. Sahakanagar is formed by the Ministry of Communication Employees housing society and has developed to this extent under the efforts of the Sahakaranagar Residents welfare association. Ever since the inclusion of 45 new wards to Bangalore city in 2008, Sahakara Nagar comes under the BBMP (Bruhat Bengaluru Mahanagara Palike) limits. The locality is accessible via NH 7 on the East.
 Sahakara Nagar was formed in the early 1980s as a co-operative society for Telecom and Post & Telegraph employees of the Government of India. It has over 8 well maintained parks and two Playgrounds maintained by BBMP. Owing to its proximity to Hebbal lake, Amrutahalli lake and GKVK forest land, Sahakar Nagar is often called the Prague of Bengaluru city.

Neighbourhood 

Sahakara Nagar comes in parts, under both Byatarayanapura and Kodigehalli wards of the BBMP, and is flanked by Hebbala, Tata Nagar, Thindlu and Vidyaranyapura
However, Sahakara Nagar is located outside the bounds of Bangalore City but is near to Kempegowda International Airport.

See also 
 Vidyaranyapura 
 Kodigehalli
Thindlu
Tata Nagar

References

External links 

Neighbourhoods in Bangalore